() is one of the 17 towns in Shanghang County, in southwestern Fujian province. It is famous as the site of the 1929 Gutian Congress where Mao Zedong affirmed his leadership of the Zhu-Mao 4th Army and stamped out democratic tendencies among the troops. The town and site may be reached by following National Route 319 west from Xinluo, the Longyan municipal centre. , it has one residential community and 20 villages under its administration.

References

Township-level divisions of Fujian
Shanghang County